Cheshmeh Madan Siyah (also Romanized as Cheshmeh Ma‘dan Sīyāh; also known as Cheshmeh Ma‘dan) is a village in Doruneh Rural District, Anabad District, Bardaskan County, Razavi Khorasan Province, Iran. At the 2006 census, its population was 42, in 8 families.

References 

Populated places in Bardaskan County